Marzahn-Hellersdorf is the tenth borough of Berlin, formed in 2001 by merging the former boroughs of Marzahn and Hellersdorf.

Geography
It is situated in the northeast of Berlin. Marzahn-Hellersdorf borders to the Berlin boroughs of Lichtenberg in the west and Treptow-Köpenick in the south as well as to the Brandenburg municipalities of Ahrensfelde in the north and Hoppegarten and Neuenhagen in the east.

Demographics
As of 2010, the borough had a total population 248,264, of whom about 30,000 (12%) were of non-German origin. Therefore, it is considered to be the least ethnically diverse borough of Berlin with the highest percentage of (Ethnic) Germans. Although the immigrant minority is relatively small, the borough has a higher concentration of Russia-born, Kazakhstan-born (e.g. Volga Germans) and Vietnamese people as compared to other parts of the city. Recently, there has been a significant influx of people with Middle Eastern and Muslim background.

Subdivision

The borough consists of five former villages which all became part of Greater Berlin in 1920:
Biesdorf
Hellersdorf
Kaulsdorf
Mahlsdorf
Marzahn

History
Each of the five districts the borough consists of originally came from one administrative district called "Landkreis Niederbarnim" and were incorporated into the city due to the establishment of Greater Berlin in 1920. Together with the two other boroughs Lichtenberg and Friedrichsfelde, they formed the borough Lichtenberg until 1979.
At the end of the 1970s especially the district Marzahn grew as a result of the building of the developing area Marzahn. Consequently, Marzahn was formed out of the five districts the borough consists of today in 1979.

As a result of the building of two more developing areas (Hellersdorf and Kaulsdorf) the number of inhabitants increased so that the borough Hellersdorf was founded out of the three districts Hellersdorf, Kaulsdorf and Mahlsdorf on 1 June 1986. 
The borough remained independent until 2001.

In view of whole Berlin, Marzahn-Hellersdorf shows the biggest changes concerning demography. In 1991 the average age of the two boroughs reached a number of 30,5 years which increased to 39,6 years due to the migration of the younger people.

Politics

District council
The governing body of Marzahn-Hellersdorf is the district council (Bezirksverordnetenversammlung). It has responsibility for passing laws and electing the city government, including the mayor. The most recent district council election was held on 26 September 2021, and the results were as follows: 

! colspan=2| Party
! Lead candidate
! Votes
! %
! +/-
! Seats
! +/-
|-
| bgcolor=| 
| align=left| Christian Democratic Union (CDU)
| align=left| Nadja Zivkovic
| 28,430
| 20.8
|  3.5
| 12
|  1
|-
| bgcolor=| 
| align=left| Social Democratic Party (SPD)
| align=left| Gordon Lemm
| 27,742
| 20.3
|  2.0
| 12
|  1
|-
| bgcolor=| 
| align=left| The Left (LINKE)
| align=left| Juliane Witt
| 27,233
| 19.9
|  6.1
| 11
|  5
|-
| bgcolor=| 
| align=left| Alternative for Germany (AfD)
| align=left| Jeannette Auricht
| 23,108
| 16.9
|  6.3
| 10
|  5
|-
| bgcolor=| 
| align=left| Alliance 90/The Greens (Grüne)
| align=left| Chantal Münster
| 9,455
| 6.9
|  2.3
| 4
|  2
|-
| bgcolor=| 
| align=left| Free Democratic Party (FDP)
| align=left| Anja Molnar
| 7,258
| 5.3
|  2.8
| 3
|  3
|-
| bgcolor=| 
| align=left| Tierschutzpartei
| align=left| Ina Seidel-Grothe
| 6,858
| 5.0
| New
| 3
| New
|-
| colspan=8 bgcolor=lightgrey|
|-
| bgcolor=| 
| align=left| Die PARTEI
| align=left| 
| 3,146
| 2.3
| New
| 0
| New
|-
| bgcolor=| 
| align=left| dieBasis
| align=left| 
| 2,365
| 1.7
| New
| 0
| New
|-
| bgcolor=| 
| align=left| The Humanists
| align=left| 
| 747
| 0.5
| New
| 0
| New
|-
| bgcolor=| 
| align=left| National Democratic Party
| align=left| 
| 557
| 0.4
|  1.2
| 0
| ±0
|-
! colspan=3| Valid votes
! 136,899
! 98.7
! 
! 
! 
|-
! colspan=3| Invalid votes
! 1,742
! 1.3
! 
! 
! 
|-
! colspan=3| Total
! 138,641
! 100.0
! 
! 55
! ±0
|-
! colspan=3| Electorate/voter turnout
! 210,618
! 65.8
!  6.8
! 
! 
|-
| colspan=8| Source: Elections Berlin
|}

District government
The district mayor (Bezirksbürgermeister) is elected by the Bezirksverordnetenversammlung, and positions in the district government (Bezirksamt) are apportioned based on party strength. Gordon Lemm of the SPD was elected mayor on 4 November 2021. Since the 2021 municipal elections, the composition of the district government is as follows:

Twin towns – sister cities

Marzahn-Hellersdorf is twinned with:

 Budapest XV (Budapest), Hungary (1991)
 Halton, England, United Kingdom (1994)
 Hoàng Mai (Hanoi), Vietnam (2013)
 Kastrychnitski (Minsk), Belarus (1993)
 Lauingen, Germany (1999)
 Tychy, Poland (1992)

See also

Berlin-Marzahn-Hellersdorf (electoral district)

References

External links
 
mahe.berlin - Unofficial infopage about Marzahn-Hellersdorf (German)

 
Districts of Berlin
2001 establishments in Germany